Erkelenz station is a station in the town of Erkelenz in the German state of North Rhine-Westphalia. It lies on the Aachen–Mönchengladbach railway and has been classified by Deutsche Bahn since January 2011 as a category 4 station. The station is served by the Wupper-Express and the Rhein-Niers-Bahn.

It consists of a simple station building from the 1950s with two platforms. Close to the station there are a park and ride lot and transfer facilities to express, regional and city buses.

While freight has declined in importance at Erkelenz station with the relocation of heavy traffic from rail to road in the 1980s, passenger traffic has developed to such an extent that the station today is the most important stop between Aachen and Moenchengladbach, based on entry and exit numbers. From 1992 to 2001, Erkelenz station was an InterRegio stop on the route towards eastern Germany (Aachen–Chemnitz). With the conversion of the railway line to electronic interlocking operation in November 2007, the crossovers were taken out, so the station is now regarded operationally as a halt, and the new German Ks-Signal system of signalling was installed. The former third platform track was taken out of use during the remodelling so that trains can no longer overtake at the station. Later, the third track was completely dismantled.

Rail services
The following services stop at the station:

Notes

External links

Railway stations in North Rhine-Westphalia
Railway stations in Germany opened in 1852
1852 establishments in Prussia
Buildings and structures in Heinsberg (district)